Novena University is the first private university in Delta State located in Ogume, Delta State, Nigeria. Novena University was  established to meet the yearnings and aspirations of Nigeria youths and women who are unable to get admitted for their academic career into  existing tertiary institutions which cannot  give opportunities or accommodate a good percentage of those seek or apply to them each year in Nigeria for admission. Novena University was Founded in the year 2005, Novena University being a  private higher-education institution located presently in Ogume, of  Delta State, Nigeria. Novena University also provides several academic and non-academic facilities and services to students including a library, as well as administrative services.

Novena University accredited courses

Novena University is one of the private universities in Nigeria that  has been fully and officially accredited by the National Universities Commsision (NUC) that run or offers different undergraduate programmes or courses that is open to interested candidates.

List of courses Novena University offers:

 Accounting
 Biochemistry
 Business administration
 Chemistry
 Computer science
 Computer science and methematics
 Economics
 Energy and petroleum studies
 Environmental management technology
 Finance
 Intelligence and security studies
 International relations and strategic studies
 Law
 Mass communication
 Microbiology
 Physics
 Physics with electronics
 Political science
 Public administration
 Public and community health
 Sociology

References

External links
Novena University Official Website

Universities and colleges in Nigeria
2005 establishments in Nigeria
Educational institutions established in 2005
Private universities and colleges in Nigeria